Water Polo was contested by men's teams at the 1998 Asian Games in Bangkok, Thailand from December 11 to December 19, 1998. All games were staged at the Thammasat Aquatic Center.

Schedule

Medalists

Results

Preliminary round

Group A

Group B

Group C

Classification 7th–9th

Final round
 The results and the points of the matches between the same teams that were already played during the preliminary round shall be taken into account for the final round.

Final standing

References
Results
Results
Results

 
1998 Asian Games events
1998
Asian Games
1998 Asian Games